The Women's individual road race events at the 2008 Summer Paralympics took place on September 13–14 at the Changping Triathlon Venue.

Handcycle classes

HC A/B/C 

The Women's individual road race HC A/B/C event took place on September 13. The race distance was 36.3 km.

Blind & visually impaired class

B&VI 1-3 

The Women's individual road race B&VI 1-3 event took place on September 14. The race distance was 72.6 km.

References

Cycling at the 2008 Summer Paralympics
Para